Not Any Weekend for Our Love, is a French film from 1950, directed by Pierre Montazel, written by Pierre Montazel, and starring by Luis Mariano. The film was also features Louis de Funès.

Cast 
 Luis Mariano: Franck Reno, the baron's son, singer
 Jules Berry: Baron Richard de Valirman
 Louis de Funès: Constantin, the Baron de Valirman's servant
 Maria Mauban: Margaret Duval, journalist
 Denise Grey: Gabrielle, the wife of Alvarez, Franck's mother
 Bernard Lajarrige: Christian, Franck's brother
 Jean Ozenne: Bertrand Touquet, Laurie's father
 Jean Carmet: the pianist

References

External links 
 
 Pas de week-end pour notre amour (1949) at the Films de France

1950 films
1950s French-language films
French black-and-white films
Films directed by Pierre Montazel
French musical films
1950 musical films
1950s French films